The district of Braga is a district in the northwest of Portugal. The district capital is the city of Braga, and it is bordered by the district of Viana do Castelo in the north, Vila Real in the east, Galicia (a Spanish autonomous community) in the northeast and Porto in the south.

Municipalities

The district comprises 14 municipalities:
 Amares
 Barcelos
 Braga
 Cabeceiras de Basto
 Celorico de Basto
 Esposende
 Fafe
 Guimarães
 Póvoa de Lanhoso
 Terras de Bouro
 Vieira do Minho
 Vila Nova de Famalicão
 Vila Verde
 Vizela
All 14 municipalities is divided into 347 parishes. It has the most parishes of any other districts of Portugal.

Geography 
The district of Braga has a very rugged terrain, dominated by high altitudes to the east, close to the Spanish border and the border with the Vila Real district, and going down towards the western coast, cutting through the valleys of several rivers that flow from the north-east to the south-west.

The highest altitudes are found in the Serra Amarela (1,361m), on the border with the Viana do Castelo district and the border with Spain, with the Serra do Gerês, whose highest altitude, 1,545m, lies precisely on the border with the Vila Real district and very close to the Spanish border, and in the western part of the Serra da Cabreira, which reaches Alto do Talefe, within the Braga district, 1,262m high.

The Cávado River valley is an important part of the hydrographic network, cutting completely through the district and dividing its mountains into two distinct areas. The Cávado enters the district in the east, where it serves as a border with the Vila Real district for a few kilometres, and flows into the Atlantic Ocean off the coast of Esposende, to the west, the only relatively flat area in the district. The Cávado River basin also includes the valley of the Homem River, which rises in Gerês mountains and flows into the Cávado at the confluence of the municipalities of Braga, Vila Verde and Amares.

To the south of the Cávado, another important valley is that of the River Ave, which rises in the district, in the Serra da Cabreira, and crosses its southern part, serving as a border with the Porto district for almost 20 km. One of the Ave's tributaries, the Vizela River, continues the southern limit of the district for another 20 km. The River Este, which flows through the district's capital, is another important tributary of the Ave.

To the north, the valley of the River Neiva serves as a border with the Viana do Castelo district along the entire lower part of the course of this river (which is quite short). On the other hand, the south-eastern part of the district forms part of the hydrographic basin of the River Douro, through the River Tâmega, which serves as a border with the Vila Real district and the Porto district, and some of its small tributaries.

There are several dams in the district. The best known is the Vilarinho das Furnas dam, in the upper reaches of the River Homem. In the lower Cávado is the Penide dam and in the upper Cávado are the Caniçada dam, the Salamonde dam and the Venda Nova dam. On the River Ave are some small dams, and the Ermal dam, which is much larger.

The coast, contained entirely within the Esposende municipality, is sandy.

Summary of votes and seats won 1976-2022

|- class="unsortable"
!rowspan=2|Parties!!%!!S!!%!!S!!%!!S!!%!!S!!%!!S!!%!!S!!%!!S!!%!!S!!%!!S!!%!!S!!%!!S!!%!!S!!%!!S!!%!!S!!%!!S!!%!!S
|- class="unsortable" align="center"
!colspan=2 | 1976
!colspan=2 | 1979
!colspan=2 | 1980
!colspan=2 | 1983
!colspan=2 | 1985
!colspan=2 | 1987
!colspan=2 | 1991
!colspan=2 | 1995
!colspan=2 | 1999
!colspan=2 | 2002
!colspan=2 | 2005
!colspan=2 | 2009
!colspan=2 | 2011
!colspan=2 | 2015
!colspan=2 | 2019
!colspan=2 | 2022
|-
| align="left"| PS || style="background:#FF66FF;"|32.3 || style="background:#FF66FF;"|6 || 30.2 || 5 || 29.3 || 5 || style="background:#FF66FF;"|39.7 || style="background:#FF66FF;"|7 || 21.8 || 4 || 25.9 || 5 || 31.5 || 5 || style="background:#FF66FF;"|42.9 || style="background:#FF66FF;"|8  || style="background:#FF66FF;"|44.3 || style="background:#FF66FF;"|8 || 37.4 || 8 || style="background:#FF66FF;"|45.4 || style="background:#FF66FF;"|9 || style="background:#FF66FF;"|41.7 || style="background:#FF66FF;"|9 || 32.9 || 7 || 30.9 || 7 || style="background:#FF66FF;"|36.4 || style="background:#FF66FF;"|8 || style="background:#FF66FF;"|42.0 || style="background:#FF66FF;"|9
|-
| align="left"| PSD || 28.6 || 5 || align=center colspan=4 rowspan=2|In AD || 27.0 || 5 || style="background:#FF9900;"|32.8 || style="background:#FF9900;"|6 || style="background:#FF9900;"|53.4 || style="background:#FF9900;"|10 || style="background:#FF9900;"|53.6 || style="background:#FF9900;"|10 || 38.2|| 7 || 36.7 || 7 || style="background:#FF9900;"|44.4 || style="background:#FF9900;"|9 || 32.9 || 7 || 30.8 || 6 || style="background:#FF9900;"|40.1 || style="background:#FF9900;"|9 || align=center colspan=2 rowspan=2|In PàF || 34.1 || 8 || 34.8 || 8
|-
| align="left"| CDS-PP || 25.2 || 4 || 18.3 || 3 || 14.0 || 2 || 5.9 || 1 || 5.6 || 1 || 10.7 || 1  || 8.9 || 1 || 9.3 || 1 || 7.8 || 1 || 9.7 || 2 || 10.4 || 2 || 4.1 || 1 || 2.1 || 
|-
| align="left"| PCP/APU/CDU || 4.2 ||  || 10.0 || 1 || 8.4 || 1 || 8.8 || 1 || 8.5 || 1 || 6.1 || 1 || 4.6 ||  || 4.5 ||  || 5.4 || 1 || 4.4 ||  || 4.8 || 1 || 4.6 || 1 || 4.9 || 1 || 5.2 || 1 || 4.0 ||  || 2.6 || 
|-
| align="left"| AD || colspan=2| || style="background:#00FFFF;"|51.9 || style="background:#00FFFF;"|9 || style="background:#00FFFF;"|54.9 || style="background:#00FFFF;"|9 || colspan=26|
|-
| align="left"| PRD || colspan=8| || 16.8 || 3 || 3.3 ||  || colspan=20|
|-
| align="left"| BE || colspan=16| || 1.2 ||  || 1.7 ||  || 4.6 ||  || 7.8 || 1 || 4.2 ||  || 8.8 || 1 || 8.9 || 2 || 3.7 || 
|-
| align="left"| PàF || colspan=26| || style="background:#00AAAA;"|45.6 || style="background:#00AAAA;"|10 || colspan=4|
|-
| align="left"| CHEGA || colspan=28| || 0.7 ||  || 5.8 || 1
|-
| align="left"| IL || colspan=28| || 0.8 ||  || 4.3 || 1
|-
! Total seats || colspan=6|15 || colspan=4|16 || colspan=2|17 || colspan=4|16 || colspan=2|17 || colspan=4|18 || colspan=10|19
|-
! colspan=33|Source: Comissão Nacional de Eleições
|}

External links
Photos from Braga (district)